Epictetus was a free cross-platform multi-database administration tool that used JVM to run. Epictetus was distributed as Freeware by Antilogic Software, but has been discontinued since 2009.

Feature Summary 

 Multithreading
 Autocomplete
 Primary and foreign keys highlight
 BLOB, CLOB autoload
 SQL syntax highlight
 Query history
 Schema browser
 Edit table data
 Restore last opened windows
 Autoupdate

Supported databases 

 Oracle Database 8i, 9i, 10g, 11g
 Microsoft SQL Server
 MySQL
 InterBase/Firebird
 PostgreSQL
 HSQLDB
 H2

External links

 "Epictetus 0.3.2 beta: Database Desktop Manager", discussion and links

Database administration tools
Java platform software
Firebird (database server)
Interbase
Oracle database tools
Microsoft database software
Sybase
Discontinued software